Martin Naughton  (born 2 May 1939), an Irish-British billionaire businessman and engineer. He is the founder of GlenDimplex, a company specializing in electrical appliances

Early life
Naughton is an alumnus of De La Salle College Dundalk, where he funds an annual scholarship programme. He is a donor to a number of educational institutions, notably Trinity College Dublin and the University of Notre Dame.

Career
Naughton founded Glen Electric in August 1973 with a small manufacturing facility employing just ten people in Newry, County Down, Northern Ireland. In 1977, Dimplex, the leading brand in the UK electrical heating market was acquired by Glen Electrics forming the Glen Dimplex Group. The company set out acquiring further businesses across the UK, with Morphy Richards, the market leader in small domestic appliances in 1985 followed by Blanella, a manufacturer of electric blankets and Burco Dean Appliances, a manufacturer of products for the catering industry, all in the same year. The 1990s saw the company forge its powers of acquisition and strategic business thinking to acquire further businesses across Europe and beyond. An engineer by profession, Naughton has overseen his company to become the world's largest manufacturer in domestic heating appliances. His company has plants in the Republic of Ireland, the United Kingdom and North America. His business has more than 8000 staff and 22 manufacturing facilities with annual sales of around $1.6 billion. Naughton's stake in the company is worth around £273 million with other investments including an art collection, property in Dublin and shares in the Merrion Hotel Group and the Sunday Tribune newspaper.

Naughton was involved in negotiating cross-border trade and promotion and support of businesses during the Northern Ireland conflict.

Honours
In 1995, Trinity College Dublin awarded him an honorary doctorate.

In 2016, Naughton was awarded the French Légion d'Honneur.

In 2017, Dublin City University awarded him an honorary doctorate.

Personal life
He is married, with three children, and lives in County Meath. In 2016, his son Fergal Naughton took over as CEO of GlenDimplex.

In 2016, Naughton and his wife Carmel were named philanthropists of the year by the Community Foundation for Ireland.

In May 2018, Business for Peace Foundation gave Naughton a Business for Peace Award in recognition of his efforts in promoting the private sector’s contribution to peace and environmental sustainability.

In November 2018, he was named as the Outstanding Contribution to Business Award winner at the Irish Post Awards 2018.

Naughton lives at Stackallan House, County Meath which he purchased from Margaret Heffernan.

References

Living people
20th-century Irish people
21st-century Irish people
Irish chief executives
Presidential appointees to the Council of State (Ireland)
Honorary Knights Commander of the Order of the British Empire
Irish billionaires
1939 births